Darreh Saki may refer to:

Darreh Saki, Dowreh
Darreh Saki, Khorramabad
Darreh Saki-ye Olya
Darreh Saki-ye Sofla